Främmestad is a locality situated in Essunga Municipality, Västra Götaland County, Sweden. It had 393 inhabitants in 2010.

Astrid Olofsdotter, daughter of Olof Skötkonung and wife of Olaf II of Norway is buried in Främmestad.

References 

Populated places in Västra Götaland County
Populated places in Essunga Municipality